Edward Lewis (died after 1790) was a British politician who sat in the House of Commons between  1761 and 1790.

Lewis was the Member of Parliament (MP) for Radnor, 1761–1768, 1769–1774 and 1775–1790.

References

Members of the Parliament of Great Britain for Welsh constituencies
British MPs 1761–1768
British MPs 1768–1774
British MPs 1774–1780
British MPs 1780–1784
British MPs 1784–1790
Year of birth missing
Year of death missing